The 2021–22 UT Arlington Mavericks women's basketball team represented University of Texas at Arlington during the 2021–22 NCAA Division I women's basketball season. The Mavericks, led by third-year head coach Shereka Wright, played their home games at the College Park Center as members of the Sun Belt Conference.

They finished the season with a 20–8 overall record, 11–4 in Sun Belt play to finish in second place.  As the second seed in the Sun Belt Tournament, they earned a bye into the second round and defeated Georgia Southern, Louisiana, and Troy to win the championship.  They received an automatic bid to the NCAA tournament, where they were the fourteenth seed in the Greensboro Region.  They lost to third seed Iowa State in the First Round to end their season.

Previous season
The Mavericks finished the season with a 13–7 overall record, 11–4 in Sun Belt play to finish in second place in the West Division.  As the second seed from the West in the Sun Belt Tournament, they earned a bye into the second round where they lost to Appalachian State.  They were not invited to the NCAA tournament or the WNIT.

Roster

Schedule

Source:

|-
!colspan=9 style=| Non-Conference Regular season

|-
!colspan=9 style=| Sun Belt Regular season

|-
!colspan=9 style=| Sun Belt Tournament

|-
!colspan=9 style=| NCAA tournament

Rankings

The Coaches Poll did not release a Week 2 poll and the AP Poll did not release a poll after the NCAA Tournament.

References

UT Arlington
UT Arlington Mavericks women's basketball seasons
UT Arlington women's
UT Arlington women's
UT Arlington